Villa Marie Intermediate, Degree and Post Graduate College (established in 1991 in Hyderabad, India) is an educational institution which was started by Dr. Y. Philomena, Founder and Director. The institution was started as a modest intermediate junior college in its present confines at Somajiguda. Since then it successfully expanded into a degree college in 1996 with an affiliation to Osmania University offering bachelor's degrees in Arts, Commerce, Business  Management, Science and Computer Applications and later as a post graduate institution offering master's degrees in Business Administration and Computer Applications.

History
This institution was established in 1991 citing the paucity of good intermediate junior colleges for women in the Hyderabad area. Since then Villa Marie has expanded to include the Undergraduate Degree division which was started in 1996 and the Post Graduate College of Management and Computer Applications in 2000.

Admissions
Admission into any intermediate course can be secured by passing in the qualifying examination Andhra Pradesh State Secondary Certificate / Central Board of Secondary Education / Indian Certificate of Secondary Education.

Admission into any undergraduate course can be secured by passing in intermediate or other equivalent programs with 60% and above marks.

Admission into M.B.A can be secured by a graduate of any discipline with 45% and above marks.

Infrastructure 

 The classrooms are well furnished and properly ventilated. Projectors are available for the Degree and MBA classrooms.
 The library with collection of more than 30,000 books. One of the salient features of VMC Library is that, it is fully automated using New Zen lib version Helium 3.1 library software system. The entire inventory in the library is Bar-Coded, which enables easy lending transactions. The system is integrated into the Open Access Catalogue (OPAC) facility catering to easy tracking of books in circulation. The Digital Library was built using D Space Digital Library Software. It Also maintains a record of previous set of question papers. To keep the students abreast with the current affairs, Delnet, an e-resource web page of our library was launched for student’s login and access all the reading material available.
 The Seminar Hall is an air-conditioned venue with seating capacity for more than 200 students. There is one on every floor equipped with a public address system and an LCD projector.
 Auditorium
 The Video Conference Hall has an oval seating arrangement for about 80 people. It allows students a close interaction with media and industry personnel. The hall located on the ground floor is also used for faculty meetings and training sessions. The facility has recently been upgraded to include video conferencing.
 The Media and Research centre is equipped with a soundproof audio visual mixing studio. It has a photography unit, editing tables and computers with the latest design software. There is a complete non-linear editing setup available to encourage film-making.

Cultural activities

 Villa Festa
 Exhibition

Students are encouraged to take part in various co-curricular activities which are job oriented. This may open doors of talent and art that covers once in a year in the form of Kala, an exhibition of art which also allows the sale of handmade items.

See also 
Education in India
Literacy in India
List of institutions of higher education in Telangana

References

External links

Universities and colleges in Hyderabad, India
1991 establishments in Andhra Pradesh
Educational institutions established in 1991